Jim Pugh and Jana Novotná were the defending champions but lost in the semifinals to Rick Leach and Zina Garrison.

Leach and Garrison defeated John Fitzgerald and Elizabeth Smylie in the final, 7–5, 6–2 to win the mixed doubles tennis title at the 1990 Wimbledon Championships.

Seeds

  Jim Pugh /  Jana Novotná (semifinals)
  Pieter Aldrich /  Elna Reinach (quarterfinals)
  Rick Leach /  Zina Garrison (champions)
  John Fitzgerald /  Elizabeth Smylie (final)
  Tomáš Šmíd /  Helena Suková (first round)
  Danie Visser /  Rosalyn Fairbank (quarterfinals)
  Cássio Motta /  Kathy Jordan (second round)
  Mark Kratzmann /  Brenda Schultz (first round)
  Darren Cahill /  Gigi Fernández (third round)
  Robert Seguso /  Lori McNeil (third round)
  Patrick McEnroe /  Meredith McGrath (second round)
  Kelly Jones /  Elise Burgin (second round)
  Paul Annacone /  Arantxa Sánchez Vicario (third round)
  Todd Woodbridge /  Nicole Provis (third round)
  Mark Woodforde /  Hana Mandlíková (second round)
  Tom Nijssen /  Manon Bollegraf (third round)

Qualifying

Draw

Finals

Top half

Section 1

Section 2

Bottom half

Section 3

Section 4

References

External links

1990 Wimbledon Championships – Doubles draws and results at the International Tennis Federation

X=Mixed Doubles
Wimbledon Championship by year – Mixed doubles
Wimbledon Championships